The Rowland B. Smith House is a historic house at 234 Agee Street in Camden, Arkansas.  This single-story wood-frame house was supposedly built in 1856, and exhibits no distinctive architectural style.  The house is L-shaped, with a four-bay facade.  A porch runs across the front under the main roof, which is supported by square columns.  The house was probably built as a "in-town" house for the owner of a cotton plantation.

The house was listed on the National Register of Historic Places in 1974.

See also
National Register of Historic Places listings in Ouachita County, Arkansas

References

Houses on the National Register of Historic Places in Arkansas
Houses completed in 1856
Houses in Ouachita County, Arkansas
Buildings and structures in Camden, Arkansas
National Register of Historic Places in Ouachita County, Arkansas
1856 establishments in Arkansas